ICPS may refer to:
 International Carnivorous Plant Society
 The International Conference on the Physics of Semiconductors
 International Conference of Physics Students
 International Centre for Parliamentary Studies, UK
 Interim Cryogenic Propulsion Stage, a modified DCSS used as the second stage of the first flight of the Space Launch System
 In-Car Payment System

See also
 ICP (disambiguation)